Francisco "Paco" Molina Simón (29 March 1930 – 14 November 2018) was a football player and manager. Born in Spain, he represented the Chile national team at international level.

Life and club career
Born in Súria, Province of Barcelona, Spain, Molina alongside his family moved to Chile when he was nine in 1939. They settled at Valparaíso after arriving there on board of SS Winnipeg as one of the 2.200 exiles which escaped from the Spanish Civil War. In 1942 he was naturalized Chilean.

During 1940s Molina joined Santiago Wanderers youth set-up with prior spell playing at amateur club Deportivo Roberto Parra. Finally in 1948, he was promoted to Wanderers first-adult team squad aged eighteen. In Chile, he played for Universidad Católica, Audax Italiano, Unión Española and Coquimbo Unido. He is considered the first Chilean player to be successful in Spain after his step in Atlético Madrid from 1953 to 1956.

International career
Molina made his international debut in a friendly match versus Yugoslav club Hajduk on 18 February 1953, where he scored a goal and Chile won 4–1. Including this match, he made a total of 8 appearances for the Chile national team, representing it at both the 1953 South American Championship, becoming the top goalscorer of the tournament with 8 goals in 6 matches, and the friendly match versus Brazil in 1959.

Coaching career
He began his coaching career in Coquimbo Unido, at the same he was a player. Next, he coached several clubs at the Chilean Primera División, including Colo-Colo.

Honours
Audax Italiano
 Primera División de Chile: 1957

Universidad Católica
 Primera División de Chile: 1961

Individual
 South American Championship top scorer: 1953

References

External links
 Francisco Molina at PartidosdeLaRoja 
 Francisco Molina at MemoriaWanderers 

1930 births
2018 deaths
People from Bages
Sportspeople from the Province of Barcelona
Naturalized citizens of Chile
Chilean footballers
Chile international footballers
Santiago Wanderers footballers
Club Deportivo Universidad Católica footballers
Atlético Madrid footballers
Audax Italiano footballers
Unión Española footballers
Coquimbo Unido footballers
Chilean Primera División players
La Liga players
Chilean expatriate sportspeople in Spain
Expatriate footballers in Spain
Chilean football managers
Coquimbo Unido managers
Deportes La Serena managers
Unión Española managers
Colo-Colo managers
Deportes Antofagasta managers
O'Higgins F.C. managers
Everton de Viña del Mar managers
Chilean Primera División managers
Association football midfielders